"Angel Eyes" is a song by American rock musician Jerry Cantrell. It was the second and final single from his 2002 solo album, Degradation Trip. The track made its radio debut in September 2002.

Release and reception
The single made its radio debut in September 2002.

MTV's Joe D'Angelo said about "Angel Eyes": 
"The gentle, melodic song is to AiC's "No Excuses" as Degradation's first single, the ominous "Anger Rising", was to "Again", from AIC's eponymous 1995 LP".

Track listing

Personnel
 Jerry Cantrell – vocals, lead guitar
 Robert Trujillo – bass guitar
 Mike Bordin – drums

References

External links
Angel Eyes at Discogs

2002 singles
2000 songs
Jerry Cantrell songs
Songs written by Jerry Cantrell
Song recordings produced by Jerry Cantrell
Rock ballads
American alternative rock songs
Roadrunner Records singles